Lobosphaeropsis is a genus of green algae, specifically of the order Chlamydomonadales.

References

External links

Chlorophyceae genera